Polabian Slavs is a collective term applied to a number of Lechitic (West Slavic) tribes who lived scattered along the Elbe river in what is today eastern Germany. The approximate territory stretched from the Baltic Sea in the north, the Saale and the Limes Saxoniae in the west, the Ore Mountains and the Western Sudetes in the south, and Poland in the east. They have also been known as Elbe Slavs or Wends. Their name derives from the Slavic po, meaning "by/next to/along", and the Slavic name for the Elbe (Labe in Czech and Łaba in Polish).

The Polabian Slavs started settling in the territory of modern Germany in the 6th century. They were largely conquered by Saxons and Danes since the 9th century and were subsequently included and gradually assimilated within the Holy Roman Empire. The tribes were gradually Germanized and assimilated in the following centuries; the Sorbs are the only descendants of the Polabian Slavs to have retained their identity and culture.

The Polabian language is now extinct. However, the two Sorbian languages are spoken by approximately 22,000-30,000 inhabitants of the region and the languages are regarded by the government of Germany as official languages of the region.

Tribes 

The Bavarian Geographer, an anonymous medieval document compiled in Regensburg in 830, contains a list of the tribes in Central Europe to the east of the Elbe. Among other tribes it lists the Uuilci (Veleti) with 95 civitates, the Nortabtrezi (Obotrites) with 53 civitates, the Milzane (Milceni) with 30 civitates, and the Hehfeldi (Hevelli) with 14 civitates.

The Great Soviet Encyclopedia classifies the Polabian Slavs in three main tribes, the Obotrites, the Veleti, and the Lusatian Sorbs.

The main tribes of the Obotritic confederation were the Obotrites proper (Wismar Bay to the Schweriner See); the Wagrians (eastern Holstein); the Warnabi (Warnower) (the upper Warnow and Mildenitz); and the Polabians proper (between the Trave and the Elbe). Other tribes associated with the confederation include the Linones (Linonen) near Lenzen, the Travnjane near the Trave, and the Drevani in the Hanoverian Wendland and the northern Altmark.

The Veleti, also known as the Liutizians or Wilzians, included the Kessinians (Kessiner, Chyzzini) along the lower Warnow and Rostock; the Circipani (Zirzipanen) between the Recknitz, Trebel, and Peene Rivers; the Tollenser east and south of the Peene along the Tollense River; and the Redarier south and east of the Tollensesee on the upper Havel. The Redarier were the most important of the Veleti tribes.

The Rani of Rügen, not to be confused with the older Germanic Rugians, are sometimes considered to be part of the Veleti. South of the Rani were the Ucri (Ukranen) along the Ucker and the Morici (Morizani, Müritzer) along the Müritz; the former gave their name to the Uckermark. Smaller tribes included the Došane along the Dosse, the Zamzizi in the Ruppin Land, and the Rěčanen on the upper Havel. Along the lower Havel and near the confluence of the Elbe and the Havel lived the Nelětici, the Liezizi, the Zemzizi, the Smeldingi (Smeldinger), and the Bethenici.

The middle Havel region and the Havelland were settled by the Hevelli, a tribe loosely connected to the Veleti. East of the Hevelli lived the Sprevane of the lower Dahme and Spree rivers. Small tribes on the middle Elbe included the Moriciani, the Zerwisti, the Serimunt, and the Nicici.

South of the Hevelli lived the ancestors of the modern Sorbs, the Lusici of Lower Lusatia and the Milceni of Upper Lusatia. Near these tribes were the Selpoli and the Besunzanen. The Colodici, Siusler, Nisanen and Glomaci (Daleminzier) lived along the upper Elbe, while the Chutici, Plisni, Gera, Puonzowa, Tucharin, Weta, and groups of Nelětici lived near the Saale. On the middle Oder lived the Leubuzzi, who were associated with medieval Poland. Small groups of West Slavs also lived on the Main and the Regnitz near Bamberg and in northeastern Bavaria.

Society

Princes

A Polabian prince was known as a knez. His power was relatively greater in Slavic society than those of Danish or Swedish kings in their kingdoms, although it was not absolute. He was the general leader of his tribe and was foremost among its nobles, holding much of the forested hinterland and expecting reverence from his warriors. However, his authority largely extended only to the territory controlled by his governor, or voivod. Each voivod governed small territories based around fortifications.

Princely power often differed between tribes. The Obodrite prince Henryk was able to maintain a sizable army ca. 1100 at the expense of the towns, and the importance of knez within the Obodrites only increased after his death. The prince of the Rani, on the other hand, was limited by the local senate, which was led by the high priest at Cape Arkona; the Rani knez was essentially first among the tribe's landowners.

Towns

The power of the prince and his governors was often restricted by the river towns, known to chroniclers as civitates, especially within the territory of the Veleti. Polabian towns were centered on small earthworks arranged in circles or ovals. The gord was situated at the highest altitude of the town and held a barracks, citadel, and princely residence. It was often protected by a moat, walls, and wooden towers. Below the gord, but still within the town walls, was the urbs or suburbium, which held the residences for the nobility and merchants. The towns often held wooden temples for Slavic gods within the urbs. Outside of the walls were homes for the peasantry. With the exception of Arkona on Rügen, few Polabian towns on the Baltic coast were built near the shore, out of concern for pirates and raiders. While not highly populated compared to Flanders or Italy, the Polabian towns were relatively large for the Baltic region, such as in comparison to those of Scandinavia.

Peasantry

The majority of Polabian Slavs were peasants in small villages who engaged in agriculture (rich in grains, flax) and animal husbandry (poultry, cattle). Some villagers were fishermen, beekeepers, or trappers. Farmland was divided into a unit called a kuritz, for which peasants paid grain taxes to the voivot.

Military

Polabian society developed during the 9th and 10th centuries under pressure from the Holy Roman Empire and the Vikings of Scandinavia. They were often forced to pay tribute to the kings of Denmark, Catholic bishops, and imperial margraves. Polabian society became militarized and its leaders began organizing armed forces and defenses. Many Polabian magnates lived in forest fortresses, while towns were inhabited by warriors and burghers.

The magnates often raided Germanic territories or engaged in piracy. In times of large-scale war, the knes took overall command. The prince's voivot ensured military service from the warriors and taxes from the peasantry. While the countryside provided land forces, the towns were known for their longships, which were lighter and lower than those used by the Danes and Swedes.

From a distance, Polabian fleets resembled those of the Scandinavians, although targets would recognize the Slavs' closely cropped hair and shrieking battle cries when they grew close. Polabian cavalry used small horses which were effective in quick raiding campaigns, but less effective against the Saxon and Danish heavy cavalry.

Religion

Religion was an important aspect of Polabian society. Much of their territory was dotted with holy places in nature to which the Slavs could pray and make offerings to Slavic gods. The priesthood was an important class which developed images and objects of worship. Polabian towns often included elaborate temples often visited for offerings and pilgrimages. In contrast, priests in the countryside often lived meagerly.

History 

The Polabian Slavs replaced the Germanic tribes who had emigrated from the 1st to 6th centuries during the Migration Period. Their settlement area was largely stable by the 8th century. Charlemagne enlisted the Obotrites as allies in his campaign against the rebellious Saxons of Holstein. Many of the Slavic tribes became dependencies of the Carolingian Empire and the Franks created the Sorbian March to defend against the Sorbs. Einhard in Vita Karoli Magni describes an expedition into Slavic territory led by Charlemagne himself, in 798. The Veleti noted as Wilzi (referred to themselves as Welatabians) were invaded by the Franks because of their continuous expeditions into Obodrite lands, with the Obodrites being allies of the Franks against the Saxons.

German campaigns against the Slavs began in earnest during the Ottonian dynasty. Henry the Fowler attacked the Slavs in several campaigns with his cavalry. During the reigns of Henry and his son Otto I, several marches were established to guard the eastern acquisitions, such as the Billung March to the north and the Marca Geronis to the south. After Gero's death in 965, the Marca Geronis was divided into the Northern March, the March of Lusatia, and the Thuringian March, the latter being divided into the marches of Zeitz, Merseburg, and Meissen. Bishoprics such as Magdeburg, Brandenburg, and Havelberg were founded to support the conversion of the Slavs to Christianity.

After the defeat of Otto II at the Battle of Stilo in 982, the pagan Slavs rebelled against the Germans the following year; the Hevelli and Liutizi destroyed the Bishoprics of Havelberg and Brandenburg, and Obotrites (Mstivoj) destroyed Hamburg. Some Slavs advanced across the Elbe into Saxon territory, but retreated when the Christian Duke of Poland, Mieszko I, attacked them from the east. The Holy Roman Empire retained only nominal control over the Slavic territories between the Elbe and the Oder. Despite the efforts of Christian missionaries, most Polabian Slavs saw Jesus as a "German god" and remained pagan.

The Obotrite prince Udo and his son Gottschalk expanded their realm by unifying the Obotrite tribes and conquering some Liutizi tribes in the 11th century. They encouraged the establishments of bishoprics to support Christian missionary activity. However, a revolt in 1066 led to the murder of Gottschalk and his replacement by the pagan Kruto of Wagria. Gottschalk's son Henry eventually killed Kruto in 1093.

From 1140 to 1143 Holsatian nobles advanced into Wagria to permanently settle in the lands of the pagan Wagri. Count Adolf II of Holstein and Henry of Badewide took control of Polabian settlements at Liubice and Racisburg. Impressed with the success of the First Crusade, Saxons began calling for a crusade against their Slav neighbors. The Wendish Crusade of 1147, concurrent to the Second Crusade, was largely unsuccessful, resulting in devastation to the Liutizi lands and forced baptisms. The campaign did secure Saxon control of Wagria and Polabia, however. The Obotrites were largely at peace with the Saxons during the following decade, although Slavic pirates raided Denmark.

Beginning in the late 1150s, King Valdemar the Great of Denmark enlisted the aid of Duke Henry the Lion of Saxony against the Slavs; their cooperation led to the death of the Obotrite prince, Niklot, in 1160. The two Christian lords distributed much of the conquered territory among their vassals. When Niklot's exiled son, Pribislav, engineered an Obotrite rebellion, the pair retaliated by occupying Demmin and warding off Pribislav's Liutizian allies.

After conquering Wagria and Polabia during the 1140s, Saxon nobles attempted to expel the "native" Slavs and replace them with Saxon and Flemish settlers. The 1164 Obotrite revolt led by Niklot's son Pribislav convinced Henry the Lion that keeping the Slavs as allies would be less troublesome. The duke returned the Christian Pribislav to power as Prince of Mecklenburg, Kessin, and Rostock, and a vassal of the Saxons.

Tactics and weaponry were decisive in Denmark's campaigns against the eastern Polabian Slavs. The Danes utilized quick coastal and river raids, tactics similar to those of the Vikings. Although they lacked siege experience, the Danes were able to cripple Slavic regions by burning crops and unwalled suburbs. Slav counterattacks were repulsed by crossbows and Norwegian longbows. The Danes occupied Rugia in 1168, conquering the Rani stronghold of Arkona. Similar to Henry's reinstatement of Pribislav as a Saxon vassal, Valdemar allowed the Rani prince Jaromar to rule as a Christian Danish vassal. After Valdemar refused to share Rugia with Henry, the Saxon duke enlisted the aid of the Obotrite confederacy and the Liutizi against the Danes; Valdemar ended the conflict by paying Henry in 1171.

Alarmed at the expansion of Henry the Lion's power, Emperor Frederick Barbarossa deposed the Saxon duke and redistributed his lands in 1180/81. The withdrawal of Saxon support left the Liutizi and their Pomeranian supporters vulnerable to the Danish fleet. A Slavic fleet attempting to reclaim Rugia was crushed at the Bay of Greifswald on 19 May 1184. Danish monks engaged in missionary activity in Pomeranian abbeys, and Prince Bogislaw I surrendered to King Canute VI in 1185 to become the Danish king's vassal.

Pribislav, a Christian prince of the Hevelli, bequeathed his lands to the Saxon Albert the Bear upon his death, thereby leading to the establishment of the Margraviate of Brandenburg.

The Lusatian Sorbs remained independent to a large extent. They were temporarily subdued by Charlemagne, but upon his death the links with the Franks were broken. In a series of bloody wars between 929 and 963 their lands were conquered by King Henry the Fowler and his son Otto the Great and were incorporated into the Kingdom of Germany. By the 14th century, the majority of Slavs living there had been Germanized and assimilated. However, the Sorbs, the descendants of the Milceni and the Lusici, have retained their identity within Lusatia, a region divided between the German states of Brandenburg and Saxony.

The Slavic language was spoken by the descendants of the Drevani in the area of the lower Elbe until the early 18th century.

See also
Sukow-Dziedzice group
Leipzig group
Tornow group
Slavic settlement of the Eastern Alps

Footnotes

References

External links

 Map of the lands inhabited by Polabian Slavs 

 
Slavic ethnic groups